The Ambassador Extraordinary and Plenipotentiary of the Russian Federation to People's Republic of Bangladesh is the official representative of the President and the Government of the Russian Federation to the President and the Government of Bangladesh.

The ambassador and his staff work at large in the Embassy of Russia in Dhaka. There is a consulate general in Chittagong.

History of diplomatic relations

Diplomatic relations at the mission level between the Soviet Union and Bangladesh were first established on 25 January 1972. The first Soviet ambassador, was appointed on 16 February 1972. With the dissolution of the Soviet Union in 1991, the Soviet ambassador, continued as representative of the Russian Federation until 1992.

List of representatives (1972 – present)

Representatives of the Soviet Union to Bangladesh (1972 – 1991)

Representatives of the Russian Federation to Bangladesh (1991 – present)

References

External links

 
Bangladesh
Russia